Blue Room Archives is the sixth studio album released from the American rock band Tantric. The album was released on September 30, 2014, via Pavement Entertainment.

Background

The band announced on their official Facebook page on August 1, 2014 that they would be releasing a new studio album of previously unreleased material throughout the band's career including newly recorded acoustic versions of their early hits "Breakdown" and "Mourning" along with two new remixes of their later hits "Mind Control" and "Fall to the Ground".

On August 28, 2014 the band announced the title of the album came from the band's personal home studio that they named "The Blue Room" where much of the production work and song writing has been done throughout the band's career.

Lead vocalist and front man Hugo Ferreira commented on the album saying: "This isn't so much a premeditated album, but a collection of music I have done that I always loved extremely but never found a place for. It's songs in their purest form, no flashy production or elaborate theme. Imagine it as a mix tape of songs I wrote or co-wrote that stand alone uniquely. A inside view of the other side of a tantric state of mind."

Promotion
To help promote the album, the band offered pre-orders of hand-signed copies of the album by lead vocalist Hugo Ferreira for $20.00.

Track listing
The track list for the album was revealed on August 1, 2014, along with the announcement of the album.

References

2014 albums
Tantric (band) albums